Billy McAvoy was a Northern Irish footballer who played in the Irish League as an inside-right with Ards in the 1960s and 1970s. McAvoy won one international cap for the Northern Ireland under-23 team. He also played for the Northern Ireland amateur team and earned one cap for the Irish League representative side.

With Ards, McAvoy won two Irish Cups (1968–69 and 1973–74), as well as the Ulster Cup, Gold Cup, County Antrim Shield and Blaxnit Cup. In 1968–69 he was named Ulster Footballer of the Year.

For almost 50 years, McAvoy had been the last player to achieve the feat of scoring a hat trick in an Irish Cup final, having done so in Ards' 4–2 win over Distillery in the 1969 final replay. This feat was not emulated until 2017, when Andrew Waterworth scored three against Coleraine in the 2017 Irish Cup final.

References

External links
Northern Ireland's Footballing Greats

Association footballers from Northern Ireland
NIFL Premiership players
Ulster Footballers of the Year
Ards F.C. players
Ballymena United F.C. players
Living people
Association football inside forwards
Year of birth missing (living people)